Westwood Square is a shopping centre located in the Malton neighbourhood of Mississauga, Ontario. The mall is located on Goreway Drive between Etude and Morning Star Drive, approximately 1.25 km west of Highway 427. The  mall is small compared to Woodbine Centre. On the north side of the mall is a  transit terminal with 15 operational platforms servicing the cities of Brampton, Mississauga, and Toronto.

History
Westwood Square was opened in December 1968, one of Mississauga's earliest enclosed malls. The intention was to build a small area for residents to shop, however as time went on, the mall started to renovate and expand. In the late 1980s, Westwood Square opened the first food court, hosting several vendors such as Subway and Tim Horton's along with various restaurants serving food from other cultures. Along with the opening of the food court. Major retailer Zellers opened in the late 80's along with the food court; however, only a decade later, Zellers was closed down and replaced with Bi-way. Many retailers were replaced through Westwood Square's history; Into Fashion replaced Society, Fine Furniture replaced Bi-way and Price Choppers was replaced with FreshCo in 2010. In 2013, one of the parking lots on the west side of the building was removed and replaced with a retail store. The former area of the mall that hosted Zellers got renovated for new washrooms, retail space, and a brand new food court. Many stores were introduced since then.

Westwood Square Bus Terminal
On the northwest side of the mall is a terminal servicing routes from MiWay, Brampton Transit, and the Toronto Transit Commission. The  terminal contains 15 platforms in operation. All platforms and the buses that service Westwood Mall are wheelchair accessible with ramps, kneeling buses, and external announcements on buses.

MiWay - Local

MiWay - Express

Brampton Transit

TTC

‡ Extra fare required when boarding west of Pearson Airport. Operates weekdays only.

References

Buildings and structures in Mississauga
Shopping malls in the Regional Municipality of Peel
Shopping malls established in 1968